Hauge is a village on the island Vesterøy in Hvaler municipality, Norway. The origin of the name Hauge is from the Old Norse word haugr meaning mound. Its population (SSB 2005) is 320.

Villages in Østfold